France has participated in the Eurovision Young Dancers 7 times since its debut in 1985. France has hosted the contest twice, in 1989 and 1999.

Participation overview

Hostings

See also
France in the Eurovision Song Contest
France in the Eurovision Young Musicians
France in the Junior Eurovision Song Contest

External links 
 Eurovision Young Dancers

Countries in the Eurovision Young Dancers